Väljaküla may refer to several places in Estonia:

Väljaküla, Pärnu County, village in Saarde Parish, Pärnu County
Väljaküla, Orissaare Parish, village in Orissaare Parish, Saare County
Väljaküla, Pihtla Parish, village in Pihtla Parish, Saare County
Väljaküla, Valjala Parish, village in Valjala Parish, Saare County
Väljaküla, Tartu County, village in Alatskivi Parish, Tartu County
Väljaküla, Valga County, village in Tõlliste Parish, Valga County